George Black House and Brickyard is a historic home and brickyard site located at Winston-Salem, Forsyth County, North Carolina.  The house was built about 1900, and is a traditional one-story, three bay, frame "triple-A" dwelling.  The front facade features an almost full-width hip-roofed attached porch.  Also on the property are the contributing remains of a brickmaking operation established about 1940.  It was the home of African-American brickmaker George H. Black, who lived and worked on this property from 1934 until his death in 1980 at the age of 101.  Black worked at Colonial Williamsburg in 1931 during the early years of restoration.

It was listed on the National Register of Historic Places in 2000.

References

African-American history in Winston-Salem, North Carolina
Industrial buildings and structures on the National Register of Historic Places in North Carolina
Houses on the National Register of Historic Places in North Carolina
Houses completed in 1900
Industrial buildings completed in 1940
Houses in Winston-Salem, North Carolina
National Register of Historic Places in Winston-Salem, North Carolina